Trešnjevo is a village in the municipality of Andrijevica, Montenegro.

Demographics
According to the 2011 census, it had a population of 461 people.

References

Serb communities in Montenegro
Populated places in Andrijevica Municipality